The naval Battle of Swally, also known as Battle of Suvali, took place on 29–30 November 1612 off the coast of Suvali (anglicised to Swally) a village near the Surat city (now in Gujarat, India) and was a victory for four English East India Company galleons over four Portuguese galleons and 26 barks (rowing vessels with no armament).

Importance 
This relatively small naval battle is historically important as it marked the beginning of the ascent of the English East India Company's presence in India (though it would only be relevant centuries after).

This battle also convinced the English East India Company to establish a small navy to safeguard their commercial interests from other European powers and also from pirates. This small beginning is regarded as the root of the modern Indian Navy.

The background to this battle also points to the main reason for the Dutch Vereenigde Oostindische Compagnie being organised in 1602.

Background 
This battle was the result of the Portuguese monopoly over trade with India in the late-15th and 16th centuries. Two English ventures, The Company of Merchant Adventurers (established 1551) which became the Muscovy Company in 1555, and the English East India Company also known as  "John Company" (established 1600), were desperately attempting to find routes to the East Indies and the spice trade. The following three individuals played a key part in the events leading up to this battle:

Ralph Fitch 
The Portuguese guarded their new-found routes to Asia very well. During July 1583, an English merchant, Ralph Fitch, was arrested for spying at Ormuz (near the modern Iranian port of Bandar Abbas). He was on a voyage from Syria to the Indian Ocean in his ship, Tiger, via what is now Iraq using the Euphrates river. Ralph was presented before the Portuguese Viceroy in Goa where he was placed under arrest. He was released on the surety provided by Jesuit priests, but escaped from Goa and wandered around India for several years. He returned to England in 1591, and became a valuable advisor to the company.

Jan Huyghens van Linschoten 
Jan Huyghens van Linschoten (1563–1611) was a Dutch Protestant traveller and historian who also served as the Portuguese Viceroy's secretary in Goa between 1583 and 1588. He returned to Holland in 1592. He published a book, Itinerario in 1596 (later published as an English edition as Discours of Voyages into Y East & West Indies) which graphically displayed for the first time in Europe, detailed maps of voyages to the East Indies, particularly India. During his stay in Goa, abusing the trust put in him by the Viceroy, Jan Huyghens meticulously copied the top-secret charts page-by-page. Even more crucially, Jan Huyghens provided nautical data like currents, deeps, islands and sandbanks, which was absolutely vital for safe navigation, along with coastal depictions to guide the way.

His publications were also responsible for the establishment of the Dutch East India Company (Vereenigde Oostindische Compagnie) in 1602 to unify Dutch efforts at trade with Asia.

Sir William Hawkins, First envoy 
Sir William Hawkins led the first voyage of the English East India Company to India and sailed into the Gujarat port of Surat on 24 August 1608 aboard the Hector. He had with him 25,000 pieces of gold and a personal letter to the Mughal Emperor Jehangir (sometimes also rendered as Cehangir or Ichan Guire) from King James I seeking trade concessions. He persisted for over two years, however pirates stole his gold, and tried several times to murder him while on shore. He returned to England empty-handed. The next envoy, Paul Canning, lasted only a few months.

Tenth voyage 
The initial voyages of the English East India Company were not necessarily to India. Each voyage was a venture in itself, separately funded by issuance of subscription stock. An eighth voyage was led in 1611 by Captain John Saris to Japan. The ninth voyage (February 1612 – August 1615) was to India and Sumatra.

The tenth voyage (1612–1614) on behalf of the English East India Company was led by Captain Thomas Best. It set out from Gravesend on 1 February 1612 passing via the present day Trinidad , then Daman on 3 September 1612 eventually reaching Surat on 5 September 1612. Surat was the principal port for the Mughals, and was then situated at the mouth of the river Tapti.

Battle 
Coincidentally, on 13 September 1612 a squadron of 16 Portuguese barks sailed into Surat. On 22 September 1612 Captain Best decided to send an emissary to the Emperor asking for permission to trade and settle a factory at Surat. If refused he planned to quit the country. This may have been partly because King James I had extended the company's charter in 1609 on the basis that it would be cancelled if no profitable ventures were concluded within three years.

On 30 September 1612 Captain Best got news that two of his men, Canning (the purser) and William Chambers were arrested while on shore. Fearing the worst, Captain Best detained a ship belonging to the Governor of Gujarat and offered to release it in exchange for his men.

On 10 October Captain Best and his ships sailed to Suvali, a small town about  North of Surat. This may have been because the Governor (Sardar Khan?) was battling a Rajput rebellion at a fort situated in the town. Between 17 and 21 October, amidst negotiations he managed to obtain a treaty with the Governor allowing trading privileges, subject to ratification by the Emperor.

A skirmish took place between the two navies on the 29th without much damage to either side.

At daylight on 30 October, Captain Best in Red Dragon sailed through the four Portuguese galleons during which three of them ran aground, and was joined by Hosiander on the other side. The Portuguese managed to get the three galleons refloated.

At 9pm that night in an attempt to set the English ships alight, a bark was sent towards them as a fire ship. But the English watch was alert, and the bark was sunk by cannon fire with the loss of eight lives.

A standoff remained until 5 December, when Captain Best sailed for the port of Diu.

Tenth voyage continues 
On 6 January 1613, Captain Best received a letter from the Emperor ratifying the treaty, which was presented by the Governor. Captain Best then ordered one of his men, Anthony Starkey, on 16 January to leave for England, via land, carrying letters of their success. Starkey later died; it was claimed by the English that he was poisoned by two Jesuit priests.

Captain Best then continued on to Ceylon on 18 January, and then onwards to Sumatra, before returning to England around April 1614 without returning to India.

Impact on Mughals 
This event sufficiently impressed the Sardar (Governor) of Gujarat, who reported it to the Emperor. Thereafter the Emperor was more favourable towards the English than the Portuguese.

Ships involved

English East India Company 
(Most references to this battle mention only the first 2 ships. James and Solomon were also part of the eighth voyage)
 Red Dragon (1595)
 Hosiander
 James
 Solomon

Portugal 

 4 galleons
 26 oared barks

Swally 
Swally is the anglicization of Suvali. Suvali port is close to the modern day village of Suvali, located in Surat, India.

The port was constructed by the English as they found it protected both from sudden squalls and military attacks. Besides, the English found it convenient to use the place for their early trade with Surat as Swally was navigable in low tides. There were several complications in using the ports at Surat as the French and the Portuguese also operated from there.

R. Sengupta, the Chief Project Co-ordinator (coastal and marine ecology) of GES advised that, "The port was also better than those located in the mouth of river Tapti. The English did not allow anyone to use the port at Swally and used to charge duty for permission to do so."

See also 
 Battle of Colachel
 Battle of Diu

References 

 Kerr, Robert (FRS. & FAS (Edin.)). A General History and Collection of Voyages and Travels, MDCCCXXIV, Vol. IX., Pt. II, Book III, Ch. X, Section XVIII.
 Roe, Sir Thomas. The Journal of Sir Thomas Roe, Embassador from His Majesty King James the First of England to Ichan Guire, the Mighty Emperor of India, Commonly Called the Great Mogul; Containing an Account of His Voyage to that Country and His Observations There, London: Awnsham & John Churchill, 1704, First Edition. Quarto. 404 (757–812)pp

Further reading 
 Foster, William. The Voyage of Thomas Best to East Indies (1612–14), New Delhi:Munshiram Manoharlal Publishers Pvt. Ltd., 1997

External links 
 Single view van Linschoten map – depicts the early Portuguese Re-Supply Point of St Helena in the south Atlantic: In Latin, Insula D. Helena sacra coeli..........Baptista a Doetichum sculp
 Robert Kerr's book at Project Gutenberg
 ( The link is to volume 9.)
 

Swally
Swally
Military history of British India
Conflicts in 1612
1612 in India
History of Surat